Veras Nesvizh is a defunct Belarusian football club based in Nyasvizh, Minsk Voblast. The team played in Belarusian Second League and later in Belarusian First League from 1995 till 2010. In February 2011 Veras was disbanded due to a loss of main sponsor.

References

External links
Profile at teams.by

Veras Nesvizh
1995 establishments in Belarus
Association football clubs established in 1995
Association football clubs disestablished in 2011